Vitan Park is a park planned for the south-east of Bucharest, located between Tineretului Park and Popești-Leordeni.

Parks in Bucharest